George Coleman (born 1935) is an American saxophonist and bandleader.

George Coleman may also refer to:

George Drumgoole Coleman (1795–1844), Irish architect in Singapore
George Preston Coleman (1870–1948), head of the Virginia Department of Transportation and mayor of Williamsburg, Virginia
George Coleman (athlete) (1916–2005), British racewalker
Bongo Joe Coleman (born George Coleman, 1923–1999), American musician
George William Coleman (born 1939), American prelate of the Roman Catholic Church

See also
George Colman (disambiguation)